Micah Ballard is a poet born in Baton Rouge, Louisiana on September 23, 1975. Since 1999 he has lived in San Francisco with his wife, poet Sunnylyn Thibodeaux. Under the imprints Auguste Press and Lew Gallery Editions they have printed over 30 books by various poets and artists.

Ballard attended the Poetics Program at New College of California in San Francisco’s  mission district where he worked with David Meltzer, Joanne Kyger, and Tom Clark. From 2000-07 he directed the Humanities Program there.

In 2007 Ballard started the short-lived Lew Gallery with Portland artist Jeff Butler and curated such notable shows as "Artworks" by David Meltzer and "Some of the Worlds Diamonds: Pieces from Living Rooms," a collaboration with painters and poets from San Francisco to New York City.

Ballard has given poetry readings at a variety of venues, including the San Francisco State Poetry Center, City Lights Bookstore, SOMArts, Pacific Northwest College of Art, Denver Museum of Contemporary Art, and the Poetry Project at St. Mark's Church. His poems have appeared in 6x6, Blue Book, Boog City, Damn the Caesars, Drunken Boat, Joe Brainard's Magazine, Le Palais de Nuit, LIT, Mirage #4 Period(ical), The Recluse, Try!, Vanitas, and the anthologies Bay Poetics and Evidence of the Paranormal, among others.

Currently, he is on the editorial board for the Contemporary Poetry Series at University of New Orleans Press. Ballard co-directs the Masters of Fine Arts in Writing Program at the University of San Francisco.

Ballard's second full-length collection of poetry, Waifs and Strays, was nominated for a California Book Award.

 Bibliography 
FULL-LENGTH POETRY COLLECTIONS

        The Michaux Notebook (FMSBW, 2019) 
        Afterlives (Bootstrap Productions, 2016) 
        Waifs and Strays (City Lights Books, 2011) 
        Parish Krewes (Bootstrap Productions, 2009) 

CRITICISM

 Negative Capability in the Verse of [[John Wieners|John Wieners]] (Auguste Press, 2001) (2nd edition Bootstrap Productions, 2017) 

CHAPBOOKS

	Selected Prose (2008-2019) (Blue Press, 2020)
	Daily Vigs (Bird & Beckett Books, 2019)
	Vesper Chimes (Gas Meter, 2014)
	Widows & Orphans (Lew Gallery, 2011)
	Darrell (Blue Press, 2007)
	New Poems (Blue Press, 2006)
	Evangeline Downs (Ugly Duckling Presse, 2006)
	Scenes from the Saragossa Manuscript (Snag Press, 2004)
	Emblematic (Old Gold, 2004)
	In the Kindness of Night (Blue Press, 2003)
	Bettina Coffin (Red Ant, 2003)
	Absinthian Journal (Old Gold, 2002)
	Chandeliers from the Metairie Cemetery (Blue Press, 2001)

COLLABORATIVE BOOKS

	Poems from the New Winter Palace with Michael Carr (arrow as aarow, 2010)
	Easy Eden with Patrick James Dunagan (Push, 2009)
	Death Race V.S.O.P. with Will Yackulic & Cedar Sigo (Red Ant, 2005)
	Wrought Iron & Burgundy with Sunnylyn Thibodeaux (Auguste Press, 2004)
	A Plywood Press Primer with Cedar Sigo (Plywood Press, 2000)

ANTHOLOGY APPEARANCES

	Bay Poetics (Faux Press, 2005)
	Evidence of the Paranormal (Owl Press, 2003)

References

External links 
Micah Ballard reads poems for InDigest's InDefinite Podcast
 https://www.youtube.com/watch?v=elQVU063Leo
 https://www.scribd.com/doc/31848115/selections-from-Micah-Ballard-s-Parish-Krewes
 http://reviews.coldfrontmag.com/parish-krewes-by-micha-ballard.html
 https://web.archive.org/web/20101214141318/http://welcometoboogcity.com/boogpdfs/bc40.pdf
 https://web.archive.org/web/20110708142130/http://www.cherrybleeds.com/bitches1/nov06.html
 http://galatearesurrection5.blogspot.com/2007/02/8-publications-by-micah-ballard.html
 http://galatearesurrection11.blogspot.com/2008/12/evangeline-downs-by-micah-ballard.html
 http://galatearesurrection3.blogspot.com/2006/08/six-chaps-by-ballard-thibodeaux.html
 http://galatearesurrection14.blogspot.com/2010/04/easy-eden-by-micah-ballard-james.html
 http://www.poetryproject.org/wp-content/uploads/nl_218_final.pdf
 http://poetryproject.org/tag/micah-ballard
 http://sites.google.com/site/gallagheronpoetry/

Living people
1975 births
New College of California
University of San Francisco faculty
Poets from Louisiana
Writers from Baton Rouge, Louisiana
21st-century American poets